Yiyang (益阳市) is a prefecture-level city in Hunan, China

Yiyang may refer to the following locations in China: 

Chinese counties
Yiyang County, Henan (宜阳县), of Luoyang Prefecture, Henan
Yiyang County, Jiangxi (弋阳县), of Shangrao Prefecture, Jiangxi

subdistricts
 Yiyang Subdistrict, a subdistrict and the seat of Changning City, Hunan
 Yiyang Subdistrict, Huangchuan (弋阳街道), a subdistrict of Huangchuan County, Henan

Other
 Chinese frigate Yiyang (548), a Type 054A frigate